Chromium(III) acetylacetonate is the coordination compound with the formula Cr(C5H7O2)3, sometimes designated as Cr(acac)3. This purplish coordination complex is used in NMR spectroscopy as a relaxation agent because of its solubility in nonpolar organic solvents and its paramagnetism.

Synthesis and structure
The compound is prepared by the reaction of chromium(III) oxide with acetylacetone (Hacac):
Cr2O3 + 6 Hacac → 2 Cr(acac)3 + 3 H2O
The complex has idealized D3 symmetry. The Cr-O distances are 1.93 Å.  The complex has been resolved into individual enantiomers by separation of its adduct with dibenzoyltartrate.

Like many other Cr(III) compounds, it has a quartet ground state.

The complex is relatively inert toward substitution but undergoes bromination at the 3-positions of the chelate rings.

Use in NMR
Often paramagnetism in compounds is detrimental for NMR spectroscopy, as the spin-lattice relaxation times are very short which leads to excessively broad peaks.  However, this can be put to advantage in the right circumstances.

The spin-lattice relaxation times for diamagnetic nuclei can be variable.  In particular, 13C quaternary carbons suffer from low signal intensity due to long relaxation times and lack of enhancement from the Nuclear Overhauser effect.  To circumvent the first issue, the addition of a small quantity (on the order of 0.1 mM) of Cr(acac)3 to an NMR sample reduces the relaxation time by providing an alternative relaxation pathway - namely through the unpaired electron.  By reducing the relaxation time, more scans can be acquired in a given amount of time, resulting in higher signal intensity.  This is particularly advantageous for quantitative 13C NMR, which requires that all signals have fully relaxed between pulses.  By reducing the relaxation time, the delay between pulses can be reduced without affecting the relative integrations of peaks.

See also
 Chromium(II) acetylacetonate

References

Acetylacetonate complexes
Chromium complexes
Chromium–oxygen compounds
Chromium(III) compounds